The Rebellion of Puebla in 1823 was an armed conflict led by independence-supporting factions fraction after the fall of the First Mexican Empire and the victory of the Casa Mata Plan Revolution.

The Sovereign State of Puebla 
While the Revolt of Querétaro was ongoing, the province of Puebla declared itself a sovereign state, installing a government composed of Brigadier José María Calderón; Manuel Posada Garduño, who was later appointed Archbishop of Mexico; and others.

State response 
To repress this independent proclamation, the Mexican government decided to send 800 soldiers under Manuel Gómez Pedraza and the division commanded by General Vicente Guerrero. Both forces restored the provincial order. Once General José Antonio de Echávarri's involvement was discovered, gave his forces to Gómez Pedraza and went to the capital to refine his conduct.

References 

 RIVA PALACIOS, Vicente (1940). RIVA PALACIOS, Vicente (1940). México á través de los siglos: historia general y completa [Mexico Across the Centuries] (G. S. López ed.). México.

Wars involving Mexico
Conflicts in 1823
Rebellions in Mexico